Pelton may refer to:

Places
 Pelton, County Durham, England
 Pelton Dam
 Pelton Fell, County Durham, England
 Pelton, New South Wales, Australia

People
 Agnes Lawrence Pelton (1881-1961), an American modernist painter 
 Byron Pelton, American politician from Colorado
 Jack J. Pelton, former CEO of Cessna Aircraft Company
 Joe Pelton, an American poker player
 Lester Allan Pelton, inventor of the
 Pelton wheel
 Robert Young Pelton, an adventure journalist
 Rod Pelton, an American politician
 Ronald Pelton, an NSA spy.